Abram M. Edelman (1863–1941) was an American architect from Los Angeles, California. Some of his buildings are listed on the National Register of Historic Places.

Early life
Abram M. Edelman was born on August 19, 1863. His father, Abram Wolf Edelman, was a migrant from Poland and the first rabbi of Los Angeles' Congregation B'nai B'rith from 1862.

Edelman apprenticed to architects in San Francisco, California.

Career
Edelman designed the El Mio House (the Smith Estate), for Judge David Patterson Hatch in 1887. It has been listed on the National Register of Historic Places since 1982. He then designed the Remick Building in 1903. It has been listed on the National Register of Historic Places since 1978.

He designed Blanchard Hall in 1909, on South Broadway (231-235). From about 1920 to 1923, he designed Breed Street Shul in Boyle Heights, Los Angeles in the Byzantine Revival architectural style.

In 1920, Edelman designed the First National Bank Building in Lemon Cove, California and the First National Bank of San Pedro in San Pedro, Los Angeles, with his nephew and fellow architect Leo W. Barnett. They also designed the clubhouse of the Hillcrest Country Club, a Jewish golf club in Cheviot Hills, Los Angeles, in 1921-1922.

Edelman designed the Theosophy Hall in Los Angeles in 1927, at 33rd St and Grand Avenue. In 1928, he worked with architect Archie C. Zimmerman to design the Alhambra Air Terminal Building at the Alhambra Airport (dismantled for real estate redevelopment in late 1940s), on Valley Boulevard near Vega Street in Alhambra, California.

Edelman designed the Shrine Auditorium, with architect John C. Austin, in 1925.

Death
Edelman died on September 2, 1941.

Gallery

References

1863 births
1941 deaths
People from Los Angeles
Architects from Los Angeles
20th-century American architects
American people of Polish-Jewish descent
19th-century American architects